Ford & Kenneth is a bus rapid transit station on the Metro A Line in Saint Paul, Minnesota.

The station is located at the intersection of Kenneth Street on Ford Parkway. Both station platforms are located near-side of Kenneth Street.

The station opened June 11, 2016 with the rest of the A Line.

Bus connections
 Route 23 - Uptown - 38th Street - Highland Village
 Route 46 - 50th Street - 46th Street - 46th Street Station - Highland Village
 Route 70 - St. Clair Avenue - West 7th Street - Burns Avenue - Sunray Transit Center
 Route 74 - 46th Street Station - Randolph Avenue - West 7th Street - East 7th Street - Sunray Transit Center
 Route 84 - Snelling Avenue - Highland Village - Sibley Plaza
 Route 87 - Rosedale Transit Center - U of M St. Paul - Cleveland Avenue - Highland Village
 Route 134 - Limited Stop - Highland Park - Cleveland Avenue - Cretin Avenue - Downtown Minneapolis
Westbound connections to local bus Routes 23, 70, 84, and 87 can be made on Ford Parkway. Eastbound Route 84 shares the platform with the A Line. Connections to local Route 46 and limited-stop Route 134 can be made one block west on Cleveland Avenue.

Notable places nearby
Highland Park Library
Highland Park, Saint Paul

References

External links 
 Metro Transit: Ford & Kenneth Station

Bus stations in Minnesota
2016 establishments in Minnesota